FC Vevey United is a Swiss football club based in Vevey, Vaud canton.

History

Vevey Sports
The club was founded in 1905 as Vevey Sports. They had 7 seasons in the Swiss Super League: 1974–75, 1981–82, 1982–83, 1983–84, 1984–85, 1985–86 and 1986–87. They lost a promotion-relegation playoff against FC Lugano in 1987. They were relegated again, to the third tier of Swiss football, in 1988.

FC Vevey Sports 05
In 2005 the club was declared bankrupt and dissolved, then refounded as FC Vevey Sports 05.

FC Vevey United
On 27 April 2018, the club was merged with Azzurri Riviera and renamed FC Vevey United.

As of 2019, Vevey play in 1. Liga Classic, the 4th tier of Swiss football league system.

Former managers
  Miroslav Blažević (1968–1971)

Current squad
As of 9 August, 2022.

References

External links
 FC Vevey Sports 05 – Swiss Football Association
 FC Vevey – WorldFootball.net

Football clubs in Switzerland
Association football clubs established in 1905
Vevey
1905 establishments in Switzerland